Colonel Edward Charles Loden MC (9 July 1940 – 7 September 2013) was a British Army officer.

He was awarded the Military Cross as a captain for his actions during the Aden Emergency in June 1967.

Loden, at the time a Major, was a commander during Bloody Sunday on 30 January 1972; he was later exonerated by the Bloody Sunday Inquiry.

Loden was shot dead on 7 September 2013 by armed robbers in Nairobi, Kenya, while he was visiting.

References

1940 births
2013 deaths
British military personnel of the Aden Emergency
British Parachute Regiment officers
Recipients of the Military Cross
People murdered in Kenya
British people murdered abroad
Deaths by firearm in Kenya